WSMN (1590 AM) is a commercial radio station broadcasting a talk radio format. It is licensed to Nashua, New Hampshire, and serves the Merrimack Valley. Its owners since March 2017 are on-air personalities George Russell and Bob Bartis.  WSMN has some local talk shows and also features paid brokered programming.

WSMN transmits with 770 watts daytime, 58 watts nighttime.  It uses a non-directional antenna at all times.  Programming is also heard on 250-watt FM translator W237FA at 95.3 MHz.

History

Early years
On , the station signed on the air.  The first voice heard was that of Manchester, New Hampshire, native Frank G. Teas who spent the next 44 years with the organization until he retired in December 2002.  The original owner was the Merrimack Valley Broadcasting System. It sold the station only one year later, to 1590 Broadcasting Corporation.

Most of its early years, WSMN had a middle-of-the-road format, mixed in with talk. This format remained in place through the decade. The organization also published an advertiser-supported, free tabloid called the 1590 Broadcaster.

Country, adult standards and talk
During the mid-1990s, WSMN attempted a country music format.  But country on AM radio became less viable after Boston country station WKLB-FM moved from 96.9 FM (now WBQT) to 99.5 FM (now WCRB).  WSMN switched to adult standards in December 1997. This was short lived; in March 1998, the station changed to news/talk, though some timeslots were temporarily filled with adult contemporary music for a time.

Initially locally oriented, in June WSMN began adding nationally-produced programming, including Talk America shows and business news from Bloomberg Radio. Two years later, Tom O'Brien signed a local marketing agreement (LMA) to take over the station's operations.

Time off the air
WSMN was forced off the air February 1, 2005, after losing the lease to its transmitter and studio site on West Hollis Street (Route 111).  The license was sold to Absolute Broadcasting, owner of WSNH (900; now WGHM) that July.

WSMN returned to the air in October from the WSNH tower, running a low-power special temporary authority signal.  It initially simulcast WSNH's ESPN Radio programming. The station began shifting back to a news/talk format in early 2006.  It began featuring programing from Talk Radio Network and Westwood One.

Bartis and Russell Broadcasting
Absolute Broadcasting sold WSMN to Bartis and Russell Broadcasting LLC for $200,000. The sale took effect on March 16, 2017. The proprietors are George Russell and Bob Bartis, who had both hosted shows on WSMN. They promised "more local programming and a refocus on the community."

WSMN formerly held a construction permit from the U.S. Federal Communications Commission to build a new three-tower array west of the old location. Instead of using the same directional pattern full-time, there would be different directional patterns for day and night.  In July 2020, the station put an FM translator on the air at 95.3 MHz.

Programming
WSMN airs Nashua This Morning with George Russell during morning drive time, with a mix of talk shows and brokered programming at other times.  Bob Bartis continues to host shows on several topics. In timeslots where a talk show is not scheduled, the station airs blocks of music. WSMN is an affiliate of USA Radio News.

Other programing includes:
"Asking for a Friend"
"Barticus Live"
"The Dana Loesch Show"
"Latinos En Vivo"
"Public Health Hour"
"The Rayla Campbell Show Live"
"Spouting Off with Host Karen Kataline"
"Turning Pages with Elaine Holden"

Former personalities
Al Rock (general manager)
Ed Lecius Sr. (news director)
Frank Teas Sr. (program director)
Weldon Haire
Maury Parent
Jeff Radzik
Eric Nuernberg (Eric O’ Neil)
Nick Diamond
Jim Liversidge
Robert "Woody" Woodland
Robert "Bob" Bevill
Chuck O'Neil
Gerry Wood
Kevin Farwell
John Halpert
Dee Dee Leigh
Griff Vautier
Russ Cooper
Dale Lonroth
Hal Hillard
Tony Broseau
Leo Zani
Steve Shaw
Herb Andrews
Ernie Anastos
Dianna Ploss

References

External links

SMN
Radio stations established in 1958
Nashua, New Hampshire
Hillsborough County, New Hampshire
News and talk radio stations in the United States
1958 establishments in New Hampshire